A channel modulator, or ion channel modulator, is a type of drug which modulates ion channels. They include channel blockers and channel openers.

Direct modulators

Ion channels are typically categorised by gating mechanism and by the ion they conduct. Note that an ion channel may overlap between different categories. Some channels conduct multiple ion currents and some are gated by multiple mechanisms.

Examples of targets for modulators include:

Voltage-gated ion channels
 Calcium channel: see also Calcium channel blocker, Calcium channel opener
 Potassium channel: see also Potassium channel blocker, Potassium channel opener
 Sodium channel: see also Sodium channel blocker, Sodium channel opener
 Chloride channel: see also Chloride channel blocker, Chloride channel opener
 Transient receptor potential channel)

Ligand gated ion channels
 5-HT3: see also 5-HT3 antagonist,
 GABAA receptor: see also GABA receptor agonist, GABA receptor antagonist
 Glutamate receptor: see also Excitatory amino acid receptor agonist, Excitatory amino acid receptor antagonist, Ionotropic glutamate receptor, Ampakine, NMDA receptor antagonist
 Nicotinic receptor: see also Nicotinic agonist, Ganglionic blocker and Neuromuscular-blocking drug)

Ion channels gated by other mechanisms (e.g. light gated and mechanosensitive ion channels). These types of channels can also be pharmacologically modulated. For lists of the substances that pharmacologically modulate them, see their respective articles.

Indirect modulators
Ion channels can also be modulated indirectly. For example with G protein coupled receptors (GPCRs), for G protein coupled inward rectifier potassium channels (GIRKs) and M channels. Ion channels can also be modulated by reuptake inhibitors and releasing agents.

See also
 Enzyme modulator
 Receptor modulator
 Transporter modulator

References

Membrane transport modulators